In March 1815, Jonathan Fisk (DR), who'd been re-elected to , resigned to accept an appointment as United States Attorney for the Southern District of New York.  A special election was held in April of that year to fill the vacancy left by his resignation.

Election results

Wilkin took his seat at the start of the 14th Congress.

See also
List of special elections to the United States House of Representatives

References

Special elections to the 14th United States Congress
1815 06
New York 1815 06
1815 New York (state) elections
New York 06
United States House of Representatives 1815 06